Lüju (吕剧) is a variety of Chinese opera from the eastern province of Shandong, China. It originated in the southwestern part of the province.

There are several theories about how this form of opera got its name.

Culture in Shandong
Chinese opera